Arthur Gladstone Havers (10 June 1898 – 27 December 1980) was an English professional golfer. Havers won the 1923 Open Championship at Royal Troon and the Glasgow Herald Tournament the following week at Gleneagles, the two big successes of his career. He played in the Ryder Cup in 1927, 1931 and 1933.

Havers was born in Norwich, England. He had first qualified for the Open in 1914 at the age of sixteen. Havers was professional at Moor Park, West Lancashire, Coombe Hill, Sandy Lodge and Frinton.

Tournament wins
1921 Northern Professional Championship
1922 Northern Professional Championship
1923 Open Championship, Glasgow Herald Tournament, Heath and Heather Tournament

Major championships

Wins (1)

Results timeline

Note: Havers only played in The Open Championship and the U.S. Open.

NT = No tournament
CUT = missed the half-way cut
"T" indicates a tie for a place

Team appearances
Great Britain vs USA (representing Great Britain): 1921 (winners), 1926 (winners)
Ryder Cup (representing Great Britain): 1927, 1931, 1933 (winners)
France–Great Britain Professional Match (representing Great Britain): 1929 (winners)
England–Scotland Professional Match (representing England): 1932 (winners), 1933 (winners), 1934 (winners)
England–Ireland Professional Match (representing England): 1932 (winners), 1933 (winners)

References

English male golfers
Winners of men's major golf championships
Ryder Cup competitors for Europe
1898 births
1980 deaths